United States gubernatorial elections were held on November 3, 1998, in 36 states and two territories.  Going into the election 24 of the seats were held by Republicans, 11 by Democrats, and one by an Independent. The elections changed the national balance of power by the loss of one Republican and the gain of one Independent, although it shifted in nine states. Democrats gained open seats in California and Iowa and defeated incumbents Fob James of Alabama and David Beasley of South Carolina, while Republicans won open seats in Colorado, Florida, Nebraska, and Nevada and the Reform Party won an open Republican governorship in Minnesota.  By the end of the election, 23 seats were held by Republicans, 11 by Democrats, one by the Reform Party, and one by an Independent.

The elections coincided with the mid-term elections for the United States Senate and the United States House of Representatives. With the exception of two states (New Hampshire and Vermont), the governors elected in this election served four-year terms. New Hampshire and Vermont's governors will serve two-year terms.

This is also the last time that someone other than a Democrat or Republican was elected governor in Maine and Minnesota. This would be the last time a third-party candidate (not an independent) would be elected governor of any state, as well as the last time an independent would be elected governor of a state until the 2010 election in Rhode Island. This was the last midterm election until 2022 in which the non-incumbent political party suffered net losses of governorships.

Summary of results

States

Territories and federal district

Closest races 
States where the margin of victory was under 1%:
 Colorado, 0.7%

States where the margin of victory was under 5%:
 Hawaii, 1.3%
 Minnesota, 2.7%
 Massachusetts, 3.4%
 Illinois, 3.5%

States where the margin of victory was under 10%:
 Ohio, 5.3%
 Iowa, 5.8%
 Guam, 6.4%
 Nebraska, 7.9%
 South Carolina, 8.0%
 Georgia, 8.4%
 Rhode Island, 8.9%
 New Mexico, 9.0%
 Nevada, 9.6%

See also
 1998 United States elections
 1998 United States Senate elections
 1998 United States House of Representatives elections

Notes

References

External links
 CNN results